Dishui Lake is the southern terminal station on Line 16 of the Shanghai Metro, located at Lingang Avenue between Shuiyun Road and Yunjuan Road in the far southeast of Pudong New Area. It serves the artificial Dishui Lake and Shanghai Maritime University, both within a short distance of the station.

Places nearby 
 Dishui Lake. The largest artificial lake in China.
 China Maritime Museum located at 197 Shengang Avenue. The museum is a 20 minute walk, or a quick taxi ride.
 Shanghai Astronomy Museum located at 380 Lingang Avenue. Opened 18 July 2021 it is 38,000 square meters, and able to host 6,000 visitors a day, it is believed to be the largest of its kind in the world.

Services 
It is served by local, express and direct services to Longyang Road on Line 16. For the local and express services, the preceding station is Lingang Avenue station. Direct trains run non-stop all the way to Longyang Road station.

References 

Railway stations in Shanghai
Line 16, Shanghai Metro
Shanghai Metro stations in Pudong
Railway stations in China opened in 2013